The Bhim self-propelled howitzer is a type of self-propelled artillery developed by the South African company Denel under the supervision of  the Indian Defence Research and Development Organisation. It was designed to meet the Indian Army's requirements for self-propelled artillery units. The howitzer is named after Bhima, one of the main protagonists and brother to Arjun of the Indian epic "Mahabharata".

History

The Bhim artillery system was developed by the Indian Defence Research and Development Organisation in the 1990s. Trials of the Bhim artillery system were successfully conducted in 1998 and 1999, but its development remained on pause for over ten years, as Denel was blacklisted by the Indian government.

Development

Bhim is a self-propelled howitzer. It consists of the Denel T6 turret mounted on an Arjun MBT chassis. It was developed and tested successfully and was cleared for production but was put on hold after Denel was banned from working on the project.

Specifications 
The Indian army required 400 mounted 155-mm /52 howitzer, of which 200 would be mounted on the Arjun chassis and another 200 to be mounted on modified TATRA trucks.

The Bhim artillery system has a fully automatic ammunition loading system as well as a turret-mounted auxiliary power unit, which powers all systems. The Bhim's primary armament is a Denel 155mm howitzer gun, while its secondary armament consists of a single 7.62mm machine gun.

References 

Self-propelled howitzers of India
155 mm artillery
Tracked self-propelled howitzers